Manchester United Football Club is an English association football club based in Old Trafford, Greater Manchester. The club was formed in Newton Heath in 1878 as Newton Heath LYR F.C., and played their first competitive match in October 1886, when they entered the First Round of the 1886–87 FA Cup. The club was renamed Manchester United F.C. in 1902, and they moved to Old Trafford in 1910. The club won its first significant trophy in 1908 – the First Division title. Since then, the club has won a further 19 league titles, along with 12 FA Cups and five League Cups. They have also been crowned champions of European football on three occasions by winning the European Cup. The club was one of 22 teams in the Premier League when it was formed in 1992. They experienced the most successful period in their history under the management of Alex Ferguson, who guided the team to 13 league titles in 21 years.

Since Manchester United's first competitive match, 955 players have made a competitive first-team appearance for the club. Many of these players have spent only a short period of their career at Manchester United before seeking opportunities in other teams; some players had their careers cut short by injury, while others left for other reasons. Jimmy Davis was killed in a car accident in 2003 having made one first-team appearance, the first Manchester United player to die during his career since the Munich air disaster, which claimed the lives of many of the Busby Babes, including Geoff Bent. The First and Second World Wars also disrupted the careers of footballers across the United Kingdom. Peter Beardsley only played one match for Manchester United but went on to have a very successful career at Newcastle United, Liverpool and several other clubs; he also won 59 caps for the England national team.

As of 26 February 2023, a total of 466 players have played fewer than 25 competitive matches for the club. Four former players – John Scott, Ted Buckle, Eddie Lewis and Michael Clegg – each made 24 appearances during their spell at Manchester United. The most recent player to make his debut for the club is Austrian midfielder Marcel Sabitzer, who came on as a substitute in the 2022–23 Premier League match against Crystal Palace. The current player closest to making his 25th appearance for the club is Dutch forward Wout Weghorst, who has made 18 appearances for Manchester United.



List of players

Appearances and goals are for first-team competitive matches only, including Premier League, Football League, FA Cup, League Cup, Charity/Community Shield, European Cup/Champions League, UEFA Cup/Europa League, Cup Winners' Cup, Inter-Cities Fairs Cup, Super Cup and Club World Cup matches; wartime matches are regarded as unofficial and are excluded, as are matches from the abandoned 1939–40 season.
Players are listed according to the date of their first-team debut for the club.

Statistics correct as of match played 16 March 2023

Table headers
 Nationality – If a player played international football, the country/countries he played for are shown. Otherwise, the player's nationality is given as their country of birth.
 Manchester United career – The year of the player's first appearance for Manchester United to the year of his last appearance.
 Starts – The number of matches started.
 Sub – The number of matches played as a substitute.
 Total – The total number of matches played, both as a starter and as a substitute.

Notes
 A utility player is one who is considered to play in more than one position.
 While Zaha was a member of Manchester United, he had multiple caps at various levels for the England national team, including the first team. After leaving Manchester United, Zaha subsequently declared for the Ivory Coast and became a full international for the Ivory Coast.

References
General

Specific

 
Players (1–24 appearances)
Manchester United
Association football player non-biographical articles